Barmy (also, Barumy-Perdli, Pardaly, and Varumy) is a village in the Agsu Rayon of Azerbaijan.

References 

Populated places in Agsu District